20/20 is a Canadian half-hour television documentary program which aired on CBC Television between April 22, 1962, and September 24, 1967. 20/20 was broadcast in the daytime in various timeslots. The program featured episodes about life in Canada, and was narrated by Harry Mannis and produced by Thom Benson (1962–63) and Richard Knowles (1963–67).

References 
 Queen's University Directory of CBC Television Series (20/20 archived listing link via archive.org)
 CBC Archives – 20/20 episode (Original broadcast date: May 16, 1967, runtime: 19:18)

1962 Canadian television series debuts
1967 Canadian television series endings
1960s Canadian documentary television series
CBC Television original programming